Lady & Liar (Chinese: 千金女贼) is a 2015 Chinese television series starring Tiffany Tang, Hawick Lau, Yang Rong and Tony Yang. It aired on Jiangsu TV from 28 January to 21 February 2015.

The series surpassed 4 billion views, breaking the record for period dramas in China. It won the "Audience's Favorite TV Drama" award at the 1st China Quality Television Drama Ceremony.

Synopsis
During the chaotic times in the 1930s, lives two girls with two different identities. Jiang Xin is the daughter of the richest household in Tianjin, while Du Xiaohan is a female thief who escaped from prison. On the way to Tianjin, an accident occurs, and Jiang Xin loses her memory. Seeing this as an opportunity, Du Xiaohan falsely assumes Jiang Xin's identity. On the other hand, Jiang Xin wakes up to find herself in the Bai household, where she is now the fiance of Bai Zhengqing, the most powerful businessman in Shanghai. Meanwhile, the man whom Jiang Xin loves deeply is also searching frantically for her. In the midst of evil and kindness, lies and false love, will Jiang Xin be able to recover her identity, and discover where her heart really lies?

Cast

Main
Tiffany Tang as Jiang Xin 
Also known as the Lady. Having lived in poverty for many years, she discovers that she is the daughter of a rich businessman when she sold her necklace to redeem money for her adoptive father's medicine. She is kind-hearted and pure.
Hawick Lau as Bai Zhengqing
Also known as White Wolf, a rich and cunning businessman. He falls in love with Jiang Xin after she saved his life; and when he discovered that she lost her memory, decided to lie to her in order to have her stay by his side.
Yang Rong as Du Xiaohan
Also known as the Liar. A female thief who escaped from the prison after she attacked the policeman who raped her. She falsely assumes Jiang Xin's identity and becomes a rich lady.
Tony Yang as Sheng Jiewen
Jiang Xin's lover, and Zhengqing's half-brother. He is a talented doctor but after encountering an incident where he was kidnapped by rival businessmen, he lost his eyesight and became depressed. The appearance of Jiang Xin brightens up his life, and they fall in love. When she is missing, he vows to find her no matter what.

Supporting
Tai Chih-yuan as Lei Batian 
Zhang Meng as Yao Mi'er
Zang Hong Na as Chun Hua
Wang Yanlin as Shi Tou
Zhang Xin as Xu Guan 
Zhang Ruijia as Qin Lan
Liang Hsiu-shen as Ye Gongsheng 
Lu Senbao as Tang Hu
Guo Ziyu as Lei Ziqian
Wang Yongqiang as Bai Zhengyuan 
Chen Youwang as Jiang Shu 
Cai Zilun as Song Ben 
Li Guohong as Secretary Wang
Wang Deshun as Uncle Can

Soundtrack

Ratings 
{| class="wikitable sortable mw-collapsible jquery-tablesorter" style="text-align:center"
! colspan="3" |Jiangsu Satellite TV CSM50 City ratings
|-
!Original air date
!Ratings
!Rank
|-
|January 28
|0.905
|4
|-
|January 29
|0.957
|4
|-
|January 30
|0.974
|4
|-
|January 31
|1.025
|3
|-
|February 1
|1.168
|3
|-
|February 2
|1.222
|3
|-
|February 3
|1.217
|3
|-
|February 4
|1.164
|3
|-
|February 5
|1.223
|3
|-
|February 6
|1.276
|2
|-
|February 7
|1.167
|3
|-
|February 8
|1.166
|3
|-
|February 9
|1.284
|3
|-
|February 10
|1.239
|3
|-
|February 11
|1.329
|3
|-
|February 12
|1.501
|2
|-
|February 13
|1.354
|2
|-
|February 14
|1.363
|2
|-
|February 15
|1.312
|3
|-
|February 16
|1.517
|3
|-
|February 17
|1.438
|3
|-
|February 20
|1.2
|2
|-
|February 21
|1.315
|2
|-
!Average:
!1.231
!2015: Rank 2
|}
 Highest ratings are marked in red, lowest ratings are marked in blue'''

References

External links

Chinese period television series
Chinese romance television series
2015 Chinese television series debuts
Jiangsu Television original programming
Television shows set in Tianjin
Television series by Youhug Media